Ivo Kozarčanin (Hrvatska Dubica, October 14, 1911 - Zagreb, February 4, 1941) was a Croatian writer, poet and literary critic.

Soon after his birth Kozarčanin's family moved to the Hungarian town of Oreglak, where his faither worked on the railroad. With the dissolution of the Austro-Hungarian Empire in 1918 his family returned to Hrvatska Dubica where Kozarčanin attended elementary and merchant schools. In 1923 he came to Zagreb where he continued his education. In 1932 he enrolled at the University of Zagreb's Faculty of Philosophy. From 1938 he was the editor of the cultural magazine Hrvatski dnevnik. He died after being shot by an armed guard of the Royal Yugoslav Army on February 4, 1941.

Works
 Mati čeka (1934)
 Sviram u sviralu (1935)
 Lirika (1935) 
 Tuga ljeta
 Mrtve oči
 Tuđa žena (1937)
 Sam čovjek (1937)
 Tihi putovi (1939)

References
Pjesnik osamljenosti i tuge 

1911 births
1941 deaths
Croatian male poets
Burials at Mirogoj Cemetery
Deaths by firearm in Yugoslavia
People murdered in Yugoslavia
20th-century Croatian poets
20th-century male writers
People from Hrvatska Dubica